Tytti Tuppurainen (born 18 February 1976) is a Finnish politician.

Born in Oulu, Tuppurainen was elected to the Finnish Parliament for the Social Democratic Party in 2011, from the constituency of Oulu. In 2019 she was re-elected to the parliament for the term 2019–2023.

Tuppurainen was appointed Minister for European Affairs in the cabinet of Prime Minister Antti Rinne in 2019. When Finland held the rotating presidency of the Council of the European Union, she led talks with member states over its budget for the years 2021–2027.

After the collapse of Rinne Cabinet in December 2019, Tuppurainen continued in the subsequent Marin Cabinet, in which she had "Ownership Steering" added to her ministerial portfolio. This refers to the policy for government-owned companies.

References

1976 births
Living people
People from Oulu
Social Democratic Party of Finland politicians
Government ministers of Finland
Members of the Parliament of Finland (2011–15)
Members of the Parliament of Finland (2015–19)
Members of the Parliament of Finland (2019–23)
21st-century Finnish women politicians
Women government ministers of Finland